The 1905–06 Illinois Fighting Illini men's basketball team represented the University of Illinois.

Regular season
Gym manager and instructor Leo Hana, was put in charge of building the basketball program. The first University of Illinois Fighting Illini men's basketball team, led by its playing captain Roy Riley, beat Champaign High School January 6, 1906, two weeks before Hana was able to replace Riley with a “professional” coach.  Elwood Brown became Illinois’ first basketball coach January 20, 1906.
In the first season of Illinois basketball the Illini went 6-8, 3-6 in the Big Ten.

Roster

Source

Schedule
												
Source																

|-	

|- align="center" bgcolor=""
	
					

|-

Awards and honors

References

Illinois Fighting Illini
Illinois Fighting Illini men's basketball seasons
1905 in sports in Illinois
1906 in sports in Illinois